The South African Air Force (SAAF) is the air warfare branch of South African National Defence Force, with its headquarters in Pretoria. The South African Air Force was established on 1 February 1920. The Air Force saw service in World War II and the Korean War. From 1966, the SAAF was involved in providing infantry support in the low-intensity Border War in Angola, South-West Africa and Rhodesia. As the war progressed, the intensity of air operations increased, until in the late 1980s when the SAAF were compelled to fly fighter missions against Angolan aircraft in order to maintain tactical air superiority. On conclusion of the Border War in 1990, aircraft numbers were severely reduced due to economic pressures as well as the cessation of hostilities with neighbouring states.

History

First World War 
After a visit to observe the 1912 military manoeuvres in Europe, Brig. Gen. C.F. Beyers (who was then Commandant-General of the Defence Force) gave an extremely positive report on the future use of aircraft for military purposes to General Smuts. Smuts initiated an arrangement with private fliers in the Cape and established a flying school at Alexandersfontein near Kimberley, known as the Paterson Aviation Syndicate School, to train pilots for the proposed South African Aviation Corps. Flying training commenced in 1913 with students who excelled on the course being sent to the Central Flying School at Upavon in Great Britain for further training. The first South African military pilot qualified on 2 June 1914.

On the outbreak of the First World War, the Union Defence Force had realised the urgent need for air support which brought about the establishment of the South African Aviation Corps (SAAC) on 29 January 1915. Aircraft were purchased from France (Henri Farman F-27) while the building of an airfield at Walvis Bay commenced in earnest in order to support operations against German forces in German South West Africa. By June 1915 the SAAC was deployed to its first operational airfield at Karibib in German South West Africa in support of Gen. Botha's South African ground forces. The SAAC flew reconnaissance and leaflet dropping missions from Karibib and later from Omaruru, where improvised bombing missions were added when pilots started dropping hand grenades and rudimentary bombs by hand. On 9 July 1915, the German forces capitulated and most of the pilots and aircraft of the SAAC were sent to Britain in support of the Imperial war effort.

Although the SAAC remained active, its activities were limited to ground training at the Cape Town Drill Hall, while the pilots who had been detached to the Royal Flying Corps (RFC) were grouped to form No. 26 Squadron RFC and later becoming an independent squadron on 8 October 1915. No. 26 Squadron was equipped with Henri Farman F-27's and B.E.2c's and was shipped to Kenya in support of the war effort in German East Africa, landing in Mombasa on 31 January 1916. The squadron flew reconnaissance and observer missions throughout the campaign until February 1918 when the squadron returned to the UK via Cape Town and arrived at Blandford Camp on 8 July 1918 and was disbanded the same day. While the SAAC were engaged in German South West Africa and 26 Sqdn RFC in East Africa, many South Africans traveled to the United Kingdom to enlist with the Royal Flying Corps. The number of South Africans in the RFC eventually reached approximately 3,000 men and suffered 260 active-duty fatalities over the Somme during the war. Forty-six pilots became fighter aces.

Founding and the inter-war period

On conclusion of the First World War, the British Government donated surplus aircraft plus spares and sufficient equipment to provide the nucleus of a fledgling air force to each of its Dominions. As part of this donation, which was to become known as the Imperial Gift, South Africa received a total of 113 aircraft from both the British Government (100 aircraft) as well as from other sources (13 aircraft).

On 1 February 1920 Colonel Pierre van Ryneveld was appointed as the Director Air Service with the task of forming an air force, the date is used to mark the founding of the South African Air Force. In December 1920 the South African National insignia was added to aircraft for the first time. An Orange, Green, Red and Blue roundel was added to an Avro 504K for trial purposes but the colours were found to be unsuitable and were replaced with a Green, Red, Lemon, Yellow and Blue roundel in December 1921. These colours remained until 1927 when they were replaced with the Orange, White and Blue roundels.

The first operational deployment of the newly formed Air Force was to quell internal dissent, when in 1922 a miner's strike on the Johannesburg gold mines turned violent and led to the declaration of martial law. 1 Squadron was called to fly reconnaissance missions and to bombard the strikers' positions. Sorties in support of the police amounted to 127 flight hours between 10 and 15 March and this inauspicious start for the SAAF led to two pilot losses, two wounded and two aircraft lost to ground fire. The SAAF was again deployed to suppress the Bondelzwart Rebellion at Kalkfontein between 29 May and 3 July 1922.

Second World War
 At the outbreak of the Second World War, South Africa had no naval vessels and the UDF's first priority was to ensure the safety of the South African coastal waters as well as the strategically important Cape sea-route. For maritime patrol operations, the SAAF took over all 29 passenger aircraft of South African Airways: 18 Junkers Ju 86Z-ls for maritime patrols and eleven Junkers Ju 52s for transport purposes. SAAF maritime patrols commenced on 21 September 1939 with 16 Squadron flying three JU-86Z's from Walvis Bay. had been established, eventually consisting of 6, 10, 22, 23, 25, 27 and 29 Squadrons.

By the end of the Second World War in August 1945, SAAF aircraft (in conjunction with British and Dutch aircraft stationed in South Africa) had intercepted 17 enemy ships, assisted in the rescue of 437 survivors of sunken ships, attacked 26 of the 36 enemy submarines that operated around the South African coast, and flown 15,000 coastal patrol sorties.

East Africa
In December 1939, The Duke of Aosta had sent a report to Mussolini recording the state of chronic unpreparedness of the Allied Forces in East Africa. The collapse of France in 1940 had prompted Mussolini to join the war on the side of the Axis and as a result, air force elements were moved to forward positions in occupied Ethiopia to mount air attacks on Allied forces before they could be re-inforced. These deployments prompted Allied action and on 13 May 1940, 1 Squadron pilots were sent to Cairo to take delivery of 18 Gloster Gladiators and to fly them south to Kenya, for operations in East Africa. 11 Squadron, equipped with Hawker Hartebeests, followed to Nairobi on 19 May 1940 and were joined by the Junkers Ju 86s of 12 Squadron on 22 May 1940.

The Kingdom of Italy declared war on 10 June 1940 and on the following day, the Ju 86s of 12 Squadron led the first air attack by the SAAF in the Second World War. During the campaign, numerous SAAF aircraft were involved in air combat with the Italian Regia Aeronautica and provided air support to South African and Allied forces in the ground war. By December 1940, ten SAAF squadrons plus 34 Flight, with a total of 94 aircraft, were operational in East Africa (1 Squadron, 2 Squadron, 3 Squadron, 11 Squadron, 12 Squadron, 14 Squadron, 40 Squadron, 41 Squadron, 50 Squadron and 60 Squadron). During this campaign, the SAAF formed a Close Support Flight of four Gladiators and four Hartebeests, with an autonomous air force commander operating with the land forces. This was the precursor of the Desert Air Force/Tactical Air Force "cab-rank" technique which were used extensively for close air support during 1943–1945. The last air combat took place on 29 October and the Italian forces surrendered on 27 November 1941. A reduced SAAF presence was maintained in East Africa for coastal patrols until May 1943.

Western Desert and North Africa

SAAF fighter, bomber, and reconnaissance squadrons played a key role in the Western Desert and North African campaigns from 1941 to 1943. One memorable feat was the Boston bombers of 12 and 24 Squadrons dropping hundreds of tons of bombs on Axis forces pushing the Eighth Army back towards Egypt during the "Gazala Gallop" in mid-1942. SAAF bombers continually harassed retreating forces towards the Tunisian border after the Second Battle of El Alamein; the South African fighters of No. 223 Wing RAF helped the Desert Air Force gain air superiority over Axis air forces. Between April 1941 and May 1943, the eleven SAAF squadrons flew 33,991 sorties and destroyed 342 enemy aircraft.

Conditions were however not ideal and pilots and crew were required to operate under critical conditions at times. Pilots were frequently sent home to the Union after gaining experience and did not return for many months, after which conditions in the desert had changed significantly and they were required to regain experience on different aircraft, different tactics and operations from different bases. There were cases where experienced fighter pilots were sent back to the Western Desert as bomber pilots for their second tour – compounding the lack of continuity and experience. The South Africans did however command the respect of their German adversaries.

The South Africans had the distinction of dropping the first and last bombs in the African conflict – the first being on 11 June 1940 on Moyale in Ethiopia and the last being on the Italian 1st Army in Tunisia. The SAAF also produced a number of SAAF Second World War air aces in the process, including John Frost and Marmaduke Pattle.

Madagascar
In fear of Japanese occupation and subsequent operations in the Indian Ocean in close proximity to South African sea lanes, Field Marshal Smuts encouraged the preemptive Allied occupation of the island of Madagascar. After much debate and further encouragement by General de Gaulle (who was urging for a Free French operation against Madagascar), Churchill and the Chiefs of Staff agreed to an invasion by means of a strong fleet and adequate air support. In March and April 1942, the SAAF had been conducting reconnaissance flights over Diego-Suarez and 32, 36 and 37 Coastal Flights were withdrawn from South African maritime patrol operations and sent to Lindi on the Indian Ocean coast of Tanzania, with an additional eleven Bristol Beauforts and six Martin Marylands to provide ongoing reconnaissance and close air support for the planned operation – to be known as Operation Ironclad.

During the amphibious / air assault carried out by the Royal Navy and Air Force on 5 May, the Vichy French Air Force consisting mainly of Morane fighters and Potez bombers had attacked the Allied fleet but had been neutralised by the Fleet Air Arm aircraft from the two aircraft carriers. Those remaining aircraft not destroyed were withdrawn by the French and flown south to other airfields on the island. Once the main airfield at Arrachart aerodrome in Diego-Suarez had been secured (13 May 1942), the SAAF Air Component flew from Lindi to Arrachart. The air component consisted of thirty-four aircraft (6 Marylands, 11 Beaufort Bombers, 12 Lockheed Lodestars and 6 Ju 52's transports). By September 1942, the South African ground forces committed to Ironclad had been party to the capturing the southern half of Madagascar as well as the small island of Nossi Be with the SAAF air component supporting these operations. During the campaign which ended with an armistice on 4 November 1942, SAAF aircraft flew a total of 401 sorties with one pilot killed in action, one killed in an accident and one succumbing to disease. Seven aircraft were lost, only one as a result of enemy action.

Sicilian and Italian campaigns
By the end of May 1943, the SAAF had two Wings and sixteen squadrons in the Middle East and North Africa with 8,000 men. With the end of the North African campaign, the SAAF role underwent change – becoming more active in fighter bomber, bomber and PR operations as opposed to the fighter role performed in the desert.

Five SAAF squadrons were designated to support the July 1943 invasion of Sicily – 1 Squadron operated combat air patrols over the beaches for the Operation Husky landings while 2, 4 and 5 Squadrons provided fighter bomber support during the Sicilian campaign. 30 Squadron (flying as No. 223 Squadron RAF during the campaign) provided light bomber support from Malta and 60 Squadron was responsible for photo reconnaissance flights in support of all Allied forces on the island. After successfully invading the island, a further three squadrons were moved to Sicily and the eight squadrons on the island were tasked with supporting the invasion of Italy: 12 and 24 Squadrons were responsible for medium bomber missions to "soften up" the enemy prior to the invasion while 40 Sqn was responsible for tactical photo-reconnaissance. 1 Squadron provided fighter cover for the 3 September 1943 landings while 2 and 4 Squadrons were responsible for bomber escort.

The South African Air Force participated in the Allied campaigns in the following theaters:

Italy (1943–45): 2, 3 7 and 8 Wings fought in operations to liberate Italy from German occupation.
Yugoslavia (1943–44): 7 Wing and 8 Wing supported partisan operations against German occupation forces.
Balkans (1944–45): Some squadrons served with the Balkan Air Force in operations over Hungary, Romania and Albania.
Warsaw (1944): 2 Wing air-supplied Warsaw during Warsaw Uprising.
Greece (1944): 2 Wing supported British operations to liberate Greece and suppress the communist coup.

Other theatres

Mobile Air Force Depot

The Mobile Air Force Depot (MAFD) was based in Pretoria. Its role during the Second World War was as a location where Air Crew could be stationed, on stand-by, prior to being posted to a more active squadron.

Berlin airlift
Post-war, the SAAF also took part in the Berlin airlift of 1948 with 20 aircrews flying Royal Air Force Dakotas. 4,133 tons of supplies were carried in 1,240 missions flown.

Korean War

At the outbreak of the Korean War, the United Nations Security Council passed a resolution calling for the withdrawal of North Korean forces in South Korea. A request was also made to all UN members for assistance. After a special Cabinet meeting on 20 July 1950 the Union Government announced that due to the long distance between South Africa and Korea, direct ground-based military participation in the conflict was impractical and unrealistic but that a SAAF fighter squadron would be made available to the UN effort. The 50 officers and 157 other ranks of 2 Sqn SAAF sailed from Durban on 26 September 1950 – they had been selected from 1,426 members of the Permanent Force who had initially volunteered for service. This initial contingent was commanded by Cmdt S. van Breda Theron DSO, DFC, AFC and included many World War II SAAF veterans. The squadron was moved to Johnson Air Base near Tokyo on 25 September 1950 for conversion training on the F-51D Mustangs supplied by the US Air Force.

On completion of conversion training, the squadron was deployed as one of the four USAF 18th Fighter-Bomber Wing squadrons and on 16 November 1950 an advance detachment consisting of 13 officers and 21 other ranks (including the Squadron Commander and his four Flight Commanders who made the crossing in their own F-51D Mustangs) left Japan for Pusan East (K-9) Air Base within the Pusan Perimeter in Korea to fly with the USAF pilots in order to familiarise themselves with the local operational conditions. On the morning of 19 November 1950, Cmdt Theron and Capt G.B. Lipawsky took off with two USAF pilots to fly the first SAAF combat sorties of the Korean War from K-9 and K-24 airfields at Pyongyang.

On 30 November the squadron was moved further south to K-13 airfield due to North Korean and Chinese advances. It was again moved even further south after the UN forces lost additional ground to the North Koreans to K-10 airfield situated on the coast close to the town of Chinhae. This was to be the squadron's permanent base for the duration of their first Korean deployment. During this period (while equipped with F-51D Mustangs) the squadron flew 10,373 sorties and lost 74 aircraft out of the total 95 allocated. Twelve pilots were killed in action, 30 missing and four wounded.

In January 1953 the squadron returned to Japan for conversion to the USAF F-86F Sabre fighter-bombers. The first Sabre mission was flown on 16 March 1953 from the K-55 airfield in South Korea, being the first SAAF jet mission flown. 2 squadron was led by ace pilot, Major Jean de Wet from AFB Langebaanweg. The squadron was tasked with fighter sweeps along the Yalu and Chong-Chong rivers as well as close air support attack missions. The squadron flew 2,032 sorties in the Sabres losing four out of the 22 aircraft supplied.

 The war ended on 27 July 1953, when the Korean Armistice Agreement was signed. During the first phase of the war, the main task of the squadron Mustangs was the interdiction of enemy supply routes which not only accounted for approximately 61.45% of SAAF combat sorties, but which reached an early peak from January to May 1951 (78% and 82%). A typical interdiction mission was an armed reconnaissance patrol usually undertaken by flights of two or four aircraft armed with two napalm bombs, 127 mm rockets and 12.7 mm machine guns. Later, after the introduction of the Sabres, the squadron was also called on to provide counter-air missions flying as fighter sweeps and interceptions against MiG-15's, but interdiction and close air support remained the primary mission. Losses were 34 SAAF pilots killed, eight taken prisoner (including the future Chief of the Air Force, General D Earp) with 74 Mustangs and 4 Sabres lost. Pilots and men of the squadron received a total of 797 medals including 2 Silver Stars, the highest US military award given to foreigners, 3 Legions of Merit, 55 Distinguished Flying Crosses and 40 Bronze Stars. In recognition of their association with 2 Squadron, the OC of 18th Fighter-Bomber Wing issued a policy directive "that all retreat ceremonies shall be preceded by the introductory bars of the South African national anthem. All personnel will render the honour to this anthem as our own."

On conclusion of hostilities, the Sabres were returned to the USAF and the squadron returned to South Africa in October 1953. During this period, the Union Defence Forces were reorganised into individual services and the SAAF became an arm of service in its own right, under an Air Chief of Staff (who was renamed "Chief of the Air Force" in 1966). It adopted a blue uniform, to replace the army khaki it had previously worn.

Rhodesian Bush War
The SAAF loaned aircraft and flew occasional covert reconnaissance, transport and combat sorties in support of the Royal Rhodesian Air Force (RRAF; renamed in 1970 as the Rhodesian Air Force (RhAF)) and the rest of the Rhodesian Security Forces from 1966 onwards. Notable operations included Operation Uric and Operation Vanity in 1979.

Border War

From 1966 to 1989, the SAAF was committed to the Border War, which was fought in northern South West Africa and surrounding states. At first, it provided limited air support to police operations against the People's Liberation Army of Namibia (the military wing of SWAPO, which was fighting to end South African rule of South West Africa). Operations intensified after the defence force took charge of the war in 1974. 
In July 1964, South Africa placed a development contract with Thomson-CSF for a mobile, all-weather, low-altitude SAM system after a South African order for the Bloodhound SAM system was refused by the UK government. This became the Crotale, or 'Cactus' in South African service. The South African government paid 85 per cent of the development costs of the system with the balance being paid for by France. The system was in service with 120 Squadron SAAF from 1970 until the late 1980s without any successful combat shootdowns.

The SAAF provided air support to the army during the 1975–76 Angola campaign, and in the many cross-border operations that were carried out against PLAN bases in Angola and Zambia from 1977 onwards.

During the bush war period, South Africa manufactured six air-deliverable tactical nuclear weapons of the "gun-type" design between 1978 and 1993. Each of the devices contained 55 kilograms of HEU with an estimated yield of 10–18 kilotons designed for delivery by Blackburn Buccaneer or English Electric Canberra aircraft. See History of the South African Air Force#Nuclear and ballistic weapons.

At least two MIG-21s of the Angolan Air Force were shot down by 3 Squadron SAAF Mirage F1s in 1981 and 1982.

From 1980 to 1984, the command structure was reorganised. Instead of units of the separate Strike Command, Transportation Command SAAF, and Maritime Air Command SAAF often being based at the same base but responsible to different chains of command, regional commands were established. Main Threat Air Command (MTAC) was made responsible for the northern half of the country, and Southern Air Command SAAF and Western Air Command SAAF for those areas. MTAC was co-located with the Air Force Command Post at Pretoria, with 20 subordinate squadrons (8 reserve). Southern Air Command at Silvermine was allocated nine squadrons (three reserve), based at AFS Port Elizabeth, Cape Town Airport, and AFB Ysterplaat, including 16 Squadron SAAF (Alouettes), 25 Squadron flying Dakotas from Ysterplaat, 27 Squadron SAAF (Piaggio 166), 35 Squadron SAAF (Avro Shackleton), and 88 Maritime Training School. Western Air Command at Windhoek relied on aircraft temporarily detached from MTAC and SAC. Airspace Control Command, Training Command and Air Logistics Command remained largely unchanged.

The SAAF was also heavily involved in the 1987–88 Angola campaign, before the New York Accords that ended the conflict. The international arms embargo imposed against the then-apartheid government of South Africa, meant that the SAAF was unable to procure modern fighter aircraft to compete with the sophisticated Soviet-supplied air defence network and Cuban Mikoyan-Gurevich MiG-23s fielded in the latter part of this conflict. South Africa was able to secure the transfer of technology from Israel through the Israel–South Africa Agreement, thereby allowing the Cheetah derivative of the IAI Kfir to be produced.

From 1990 with the perceived reduction in threat, SAAF operational strength began to be reduced. The first short term steps entailed the withdrawal of several obsolete aircraft types from service, such as the Canberra B(1)12, the Super Frelon and Westland Wasp helicopters, the Kudu light aircraft and the P-166s Albatross coastal patrol aircraft. Other initial measures included the downgrading of Air Force Base Port Elizabeth and the disbanding of 12, 16, 24, 25, and 27 Squadrons. Two Commando squadrons – 103 Squadron SAAF at AFB Bloemspruit and 114 Squadron SAAF at AFB Swartkop – were also disbanded.

Air Defence Artillery Group
The 250 Air Defence Artillery Group, also known as the 250 Air Defence Unit (ADU), was a group of air defence squadrons that operated under the control of the South African Air Force tasked with airbase defence. The group consisted of 120, 121, 122, 123, 124, 125, 126, 127, 128, 129 and 130 Squadrons and had its own active Citizen Force component. These squadrons were equipped with the Tigercat mobile surface-to-air missile system, The Cactus surface-to-air missile system, the ZU-23-2 23mm Anti-Aircraft Gun and the Bofors 40 mm gun.

120 Squadron mainly operated the Cactus missile system operationally in platoons from 1973 until the late 1980s with each platoon consisting of one Acquisition and Co-ordination Unit (ACU) and two or three firing units, with a battery having two platoons. 121 Squadron, 123 Squadron and later 129 Squadron mainly operated the Tigercat mobile surface-to-air missile system. In South African service it was given the name "Hilda". 123 Squadron was deployed for Operation Savannah in 1975 to provide air defence for Air Force Base Grootfontein in South-West Africa. 129 Squadron was deployed to Air Force Base Ondangwa for the remainder of the Border War to provide air defence for the logistics base and airfield there, as it was an important staging area for the South African Defence Force for their operations in neighbouring Angola.

The Air Defence Artillery Group was disbanded in 1992 after the Cactus missile system was retired, with only remnants of 120 Squadron, operating the upgraded Cactus Container system, becoming a part of Air Command Control Unit at Snake Valley opposite Air Force Base Swartkop on the eastern side of the shared runway. 120 Squadron was finally disbanded in 2002 after these systems were retired.

Major operations

During the bush war, the SAAF lost a total of 22 aircraft  (1974–1989) to enemy action. A further 11 aircraft  were lost in the operational area due to pilot error or malfunction.

Since 1994
After the first South African multi-racial elections in 1994, the SAAF became part of the South African National Defence Force (SANDF). The South African Air Force is currently considered to be the most effective air force in sub-Sahara Africa despite the loss of capability as a consequence of defence cuts after the end of the Border War.

These financial cuts have brought about a number of severe operational limitations, compounded by the loss of experienced air-crews. This has placed strain on the bringing new types of aircraft into service, specifically the Gripen, Hawk, Rooivalk, A 109 and Lynx. The cancellation of the SAAF participation and procurement of the A400M in November 2009 has denied the SAAF the strategic airlift capability needed for domestic, regional and continent-wide transport operations. There is no clear indication as yet regarding how the heavy/long-range airlift gap will be addressed.

Current air combat capabilities are limited to the Gripen multi-role fighter and the Rooivalk combat support helicopter although in insufficient number to allow regional deployments while maintaining national air security and current training commitments. To overcome this shortfall, the SAAF has designated the Hawk Mk 120 trainers for additional tactical reconnaissance and weapon delivery platforms for targets designated by the Gripens. Financial constraints have further limited flying hours on the newly acquired aircraft; it was planned to keep Gripen pilots current flying the lower cost Hawk aircraft with "Gripenised" cockpits. It was reported in 2013 that the Gripen fleet wasn't fully manned with some pilots redesignated as reserve pilots and others being assigned instructor roles at Air Force Base Makhado. The SAAF stated that the Gripen fleet is being rotated between short-term storage and active use by the regular active pilots to spread the limited flying hours among the whole fleet. 
During this same period it was reported that 18 of the SAAF's AgustaWestland AW109 helicopters have been grounded due to an accident involving one of the helicopters several months prior and a lack of funds for regular maintenance, however in November 2013 after five months of not flying, the grounding of the helicopters was lifted after more funds became available.
Despite all its setbacks and financial woes, the South African Air Force continues to undertake and complete the tasks and obligations assigned to it. The SAAF still plays a vital role in national security operations, United Nations peacekeeping missions, and other foreign deployments.  the Air force has several aircraft, aircrew and ground crew on foreign deployments. Three Rooivalk attack helicopters from 16 Squadron SAAF and five or six 15, 17, 19 and/or 22 Squadron SAAF's Oryx transport helicopters were stationed in Goma in the Democratic Republic of the Congo as part of the United Nations Organization Stabilization Mission in the Democratic Republic of the Congo (MONUSCO). The Rooivalk and Oryx Helicopters are part of the South African contribution to the 3000-strong United Nations Force Intervention Brigade (FIB) and they have flown several sorties against rebel factions who are operating in North Kivu province, particularly the notorious M23 militia group who were routed from their strongholds after an offensive by the UN Force Intervention Brigade and the Military of the Democratic Republic of the Congo.

Several 28 Squadron SAAF C-130BZ Hercules aircraft also regularly flew to Sudan, DR Congo and Uganda, including Lubumbashi, Kinshasa, Goma, Beni, Bunia and Entebbe, as Entebbe is the logistic hub for MONUSCO in the eastern DR Congo. They mainly fly missions ranging from logistic support for SA National Defence Force continental peacekeeping and peace support operations, humanitarian operations, support to the South African Army, and general airlift. A C-47TP Turbo Dakota from 35 Squadron SAAF permanently based in the Mozambican city of Pemba to provide maritime patrol capability for the Southern African Development Community (SADC) counter-piracy mission in the Mozambique Channel, Operation Copper. There is also a Super Lynx from 22 Squadron SAAF operating from the South African Navy frigates whenever they are stationed in the Mozambican channel. The air force also assists Operation Corona from "time to time" by deploying either AgustaWestland AW109 or Atlas Oryx helicopters to its borders.

During the 2010 FIFA World Cup the South African National Defence Force was deployed in order to provide security for the event. The air force deployed armed Gripen Fighter aircraft and Hawk advanced trainer aircraft to conduct air patrols to monitor air traffic. Rooivalk, Atlas Oryx and AgustaWestland AW109 helicopters were also deployed during the event.

It was also reported by the Afrikaans daily newspaper, Beeld, that on 23 March 2013 when the Séléka rebel group attempted to take power in the Central African Republic by invading the capital of Bangui, four armed Gripen Fighter aircraft from 2 Squadron SAAF were sent along with a C-130BZ transport aircraft (reportedly carrying a stock of bombs) in order to provide close air support to the 200-strong South African garrison who were still fighting in the city. The aircraft were, however, recalled shortly after, as the South Africans and the rebels agreed to a ceasefire and rather opted to withdraw peacefully from the country. Several flights made by C-130BZ aircraft evacuated the bodies of the 13 South African soldiers who were killed and the 27 who were wounded during the Séléka offensive and also the remainder of the deployed soldiers and their equipment after the ceasefire was declared. The deployment of the Gripen fighter aircraft indicated that if the situation called for it, the country will deploy its fighter aircraft in order to ensure the protection of its assets.

The air force was also tasked with maintaining national security before and during the funeral procession of former president Nelson Mandela in December 2013. Several SAAF helicopters conducted patrols over Pretoria while the former president's body was lying in state in the days leading up to the funeral. Gripen fighter aircraft, armed with IRIS-T missiles and Digital Joint Reconnaissance Pods, conducted combat air patrols to enforce a no-fly zone for several days over certain areas in Gauteng province and later during the funeral itself over Qunu, in the Eastern Cape. Two Gripens were also tasked with escorting a C-130BZ aircraft, which was carrying President Mandela's body from Air Force Base Waterkloof to the Mthatha Airport. Five Gripens, three Oryx helicopters and the 6 Pilatus PC-7's of the Silver Falcons performed a flypast in a final salute to the late former president.

On 12 September 2014, a church hostel collapsed within the compound of the Synagogue, Church of All Nations in Lagos, Nigeria. More than 100 persons died in the collapse, among them 85 South Africans. President Jacob Zuma ordered the South African Air Force to assist with the repatriation of survivors and victims, and the first 25 survivors were flown to South Africa in a specially adapted SAAF Hercules C-130 on 22 September 2014. Due to a lack of airlift capacity, an Antonov aircraft from Maximus Aero was chartered in order to repatriate the bodies of 74 victims, which arrived on 15 November 2014. The last 11 bodies were finally repatriated using an SAAF C-130 on 6 February 2015. The delay in repatriating the last bodies was due to authorities having to wait for DNA test results in order to positively identify the remaining victims.

In spite of its budget concerns, the air force still continues to participate in and support annual air and defence shows and capability demonstrations such as the Rand show, the Zwartkops airshow and the Africa Aerospace and Defence Expo.

In 2002 Musa Mbhokota became the SAAF's first black jet fighter pilot. In March 2017 Nandi Zama became for first black woman in SAAF history to command and fly a Hercules C-130 cargo plane.

As of 2021, Department of Defence officials informed Parliament that a reduced availability of aircraft was negatively affecting hours flown. Helicopter systems were said to have "a critical spares shortage" with similar problems also confronting the transport and combat aircraft and systems. The parliamentary Defence and Military Veterans (PCDMV) committee was told that "Constrained funding is also affecting the ability to provide enough serviceable aircraft, although serious efforts are being made to ensure availability is increased within the reduced budget". During the first quarter of the 2021/22 financial year, the air force flew 3,560.8 hours, including 2,717 Force Preparation hours, 636.7 Force Employment hours; and 207.1 VIP flying hours. As of late 2021, all the Air Force's Gripen fighter aircraft were grounded. However, in 2022 the Air Force concluded a deal with Saab to return 13 of the aircraft to service over a three-year period.

Symbols

Ensign

Roundels

Rank insignia

In 2002 the Air Force rank insignia were changed from one which was shared with the Army to a new pattern based on stripes. The Air Force stated that this was "in order to bring it more in line with international forms of rank". The General ranks initially had a thick stripe (thicker than the Senior Officer rank stripe) with thin stripes above, but this was changed shortly after implementation to the crossed sword and baton insignia typical of Commonwealth Generals. The reason for the change so soon after implementation of the new insignia was presumed to be confusion in differentiating between Generals and Senior Officers.

Officers

Warrant officers
Note: The Rank of Master Chief Warrant Officer is only used when the Sergeant Major of the Air Force is also the Sergeant Major of the Defence Force.

Other ranks

SAAF medals and decorations

A new set of emblems, medals and decorations were introduced on 29 April 2003, although medals issued by the SADF can still be worn.

Unit emblems

Air force bases

Flying squadrons

Reserve squadrons

Other flying units

Security squadrons

Engineering support units

Air defence artillery units

Command and control units

The various Forward Air Command Posts and Air Operations Teams were closed on 31 December 2003 and integrated in the new Joint Regional Task Groups under command of Chief of Joint Operations.

Training units

Support units

Order of battle, bases squadrons and equipment

Bases

Squadrons

Aircraft

Current inventory

Retired
Previous notable aircraft operated by the SAAF include Atlas Cheetah, Mirage F1,  Mirage III, C-130F Hercules.

Retired aircraft see: List of aircraft of the South African Air Force.

Weapon systems

For weapon system no longer in use, see List of obsolete weapon systems of the South African Air Force.

Air Force Mobile Deployment Wing

The Air Force Mobile Deployment Wing (AFMDW) provides combat ready, integrated and deployable air support capabilities to the South African National Defence Force. The AFMDW consists of 18 Deployment Support Unit, Mobile Communications Unit, 140 Squadron and 142 Squadron, 500 Squadron and 501 Squadron.

Reserves
The Air Force Conventional Reserves are a pool of reserve posts created to serve the SAAF and augment regular units as and when needed. All trades in the SAAF are represented in the reserves, e.g. pilots, security squadron personnel etc.
The Air Force Territorial Reserve currently consists of nine squadrons of privately owned aircraft operated by reserve pilots on behalf of the SAAF who assist in light transport and observation roles.

Other establishments and units

Air Force Memorial

The South African Air Force Memorial is a memorial to South African Air Force members who have died whilst in service of the South African Air Corps and the South African Air Force from 1915 to the present. The memorial is located at Swartkop outside Pretoria.

Air Force Museum

The South African Air Force Museum houses, exhibits and restores material related to the history of the South African Air Force. It is spread across three locations; AFB Swartkop outside Pretoria, AFB Ysterplaat in Cape Town and at the Port Elizabeth airport. Swartkop is the largest of the three museum locations, occupying at least five hangars and contains a number of Atlas Cheetahs as well as a Cheetah C flight simulator.

Silver Falcons

The Silver Falcons are the aerobatic display team of the South African Air Force and are based at Air Force Base Langebaanweg near Cape Town. The Silver Falcons fly the Pilatus PC-7 Mk II Astra, the basic trainer of the SA Air Force in a 5-ship routine. The main purpose is to enhance the image of the South African Air Force, encourage recruitment and instill national pride through public display.

Radar coverage 
The South African Air Force operates several radar systems within the country's borders and can deploy radar systems internationally to support external South African operations such as during UN peacekeeping operations. The Air Force's radar equipment is also supplemented by radar equipment and data from the other branches of the South African National Defence Force, the South African Weather Service and several civilian airport radars who cooperate with the Air Force to monitor air traffic.

Each air force base is equipped with air field radar approach systems (AFRAS) that monitors air traffic within the airfield's operational sector 24 hours per day. These systems include primary approach radars, precision approach radars, and secondary surveillance radar and display systems. These systems have a range of more than 120 km. The AFRAS are maintained by Saab Grintek as well as Tellumat. Air Force Base Overberg in the Western Cape is also equipped with a Doppler tracking radar and is used primarily by the Test Flight and Development Centre SAAF and the Denel Overberg Test Range for aircraft and missile development tests. In the Western Cape there is a radar station at Kapteinskop, jointly used by Air Force Base Langebaanweg and Cape Town International Airport to monitor air traffic. Air Force Base Makhado has another radar station located in the mountains to the north of the main base complex apart from its AFRAS radar (located in the main base itself).

The Air Force maintains six Umlindi (Zulu: "Watchman") AR3D long-range early warning radar systems (British AR3D radar systems extensively upgraded by the South African company, Tellumat) which are operated by 140 Squadron SAAF as part of the South African Air Force Mobile Deployment Wing. There are two static radar stations located in Lephalale (Ellisras) and Mariepskop, near Air Force Base Hoedspruit. The other systems are mobile and can be deployed to any part of the country to support operations with the use of 20-ton 8x8 MAN trucks. Each of these systems has a range of 500 km but can only track aircraft flying above 700 metres. The static radars are usually linked to two Air Force sector control centres (SCC), the Lowveld Airspace Control Sector and the Bushveld Airspace Control Sector, while the mobile radar have their own mobile sector control centres (MSCC).

To mitigate this lack of low-level radar coverage, the Air Force also operates four Plessey Tactical Mobile Radar (TMR) systems (in service with 142 Squadron SAAF). These systems can cover altitudes below 700 metres, but they have a shorter range than the Umlindi systems, at 150 km. The deployment of these systems require the use of a MAN 8×8 truck (one per system), one or two light vehicles for command and control purposes, a water tanker, a diesel bowser and a technical workshop vehicle. These systems can operate 24 hours a day with less than 20 personnel (including personnel from other AFMDW units like the Mobile Communications Unit and 501 Squadron).

The South African Air Force's Saab JAS 39 Gripen fighter aircraft are also equipped with PS-05/A pulse-doppler X-band multi-mode radar, developed by Ericsson and GEC-Marconi. This all-weather radar system is capable of locating and identifying air targets 120 km away and surface targets 70 km away. It is also able to automatically track multiple targets in the upper and lower spheres, on the ground and sea or in the air. It can guide several beyond visual range air-to-air missiles to multiple targets simultaneously (although the Air Force still lacks modern beyond visual range missile capability). When deployed operationally on combat missions and air patrols the aircraft can link their systems to the South African National Defence Force's digital network protocol, Link-ZA, to share data with other radar systems to help create a wider picture as to the situation in the air and on the ground in order to rapidly adapt to a change in short term situations.

Other branches of the South African National Defence Force also operate several radar systems that can assist the South African Air Force. The South African Navy uses four Valour-class frigates, each of which is equipped with the Thales Naval France MRR-3D NG G-band multi-role surveillance/self-defence radar that can detect low and medium-level targets at ranges of up to 140 km and in long-range 3D air surveillance mode targets up to 180 km. In the self-defence mode, it can detect and track any threat within a radius of 60 km. These Frigates can link their data systems to the Link-ZA system to help create a broader picture for the armed forces. The South African Army also operates several Reutech Radar Systems (RRS) ESR220 Thutlhwa (Kameelperd/Giraffe) Mobile Battery Fire Control Post Systems. These NATO D-Band radars have a range of 120 km and can also be linked to Link-ZA to assist air force operations.

Civilian airport radars in all nine provinces as well as the network of South African Weather Service radars can also share their radar data with the South African Air Force. According to the South African Weather Service, the South African Air Force has access to raw data from their ten long range fixed system Doppler (S-Band) and two short range mobile (X-Band) meteorological radars, and the interpreted information can be used for aviation and defence purposes.

Training Areas

Ditholo Training Area
Situated 66 km north of Pretoria, Ditholo Training Area used to house Air Defence Artillery Group until 1992. The 3300 hectare property is used primarily for gravel runway training, radar tracking, and aerial cargo drop exercises such as LAPES. Low Altitude Parachute Extraction System (LAPES) is a tactical military airlift delivery method where a fixed wing cargo aircraft can deposit supplies when landing is not an option in an area that is too small to accurately parachute supplies from a high altitude.

Other training include: Search and rescue exercises, basic training, VIP protection, candidate officer training, task force training and escape and evasion training.

Due to its unique ecology, Ditholo is also a registered nature reserve, being one of the few remaining portions of Kalahari plains thornveld in existence. As of 2013, Ditholo is run jointly with the Gauteng Provincial Government as part of the Dinokeng Biosphere Reserve. As of 24 May 2014 it houses more than 340 species of birds and large mammal species such as giraffe, lion, zebra, tsessebe, blue wildebeest, kudu and waterbuck.

The Roodewal Weapons Range
Situated in the Limpopo Province, roughly halfway between Polokwane (previously Pietersburg) and AFB Makhado, near the town of Louis Trichardt. This property is used for air superiority training. Buffering the range is the Corbadraai Nature Reserve.

Temporary Air Base Upington
Activated only for large scale exercises in the Northern Cape.

Dragons Peak Drakensberg
In 1985 a satellite base at Dragons Peak, in the Drakensberg was established in order to conduct helicopter mountain flying training.

Vastrap
Vastrap (Afrikaans: "stand firm") is a small military airfield situated in the Kalahari Desert north east of Upington inside a 700 square kilometre weapons test range of the same name[1] belonging to the South African National Defence Force. It was constructed to allow the SAAF to practice tactical bombing operations, and for aircraft to service the ARMSCOR's defunct underground nuclear weapon test site.

Environmental Management

 
The SAAF's training areas and bases are home to many species of fauna and flora as well as, in some instances, buildings and other structures of historical and cultural value. The Environmental Services sub-department in the SANDF Logistics Division has the overall task of ensuring proper environmental practices are in place not only on training grounds but also at bases.

The following specific management is practiced:

 Integrated Training Area Management (ITAM) aims to enhance long term, effective training by implementing management practices for land and aerial ranges to ensure their continued use and minimised environmental damage.
 Base Environmental Management (BEM) system proper management of buildings, responsible water and energy use, integrated waste management as well as ensuring cultural and historical resources are properly maintained.
 Environment for Operations (ECOps) aims to ensure adverse effects of military activities on the general environment are avoided or mitigated throughout any specific operations.

Notes

References

Bibliography
 Green, William and Gordon Swanborough. "Annals of the Gauntlet". Air Enthusiast Quarterly, No. 2, n.d., pp. 163–176. 
 Spring, Ivan. "Springbok Jet Age: The Gloster Meteor III in SAAF service". Air Enthusiast, No. 55, Autumn 1994, pp. 8–12.

External links

Official South African Air Force website (website currently inactive)
Unofficial South African Air Force website
SAAF ejection seat history

 
1920 establishments in South Africa
Military units and formations established in 1920